Bolimów Landscape Park (Bolimowski Park Krajobrazowy) is a protected area (Landscape Park) in central Poland, established in 1986, covering an area of .

The Park is shared between two voivodeships: Łódź Voivodeship and Masovian Voivodeship. Within Łódź Voivodeship it lies in Łowicz County (Gmina Nieborów) and Skierniewice County (Gmina Bolimów, Gmina Kowiesy, Gmina Nowy Kawęczyn). Within Masovian Voivodeship it lies in Żyrardów County (Gmina Puszcza Mariańska, Gmina Wiskitki).

Within the Park are five nature reserves.

References

Landscape parks in Poland
Parks in Łódź Voivodeship